Ashes to Ashes  is the debut album from the heavy metal band David Shankle Group. The Japanese version of the album contains two bonus tracks, called Daydreams and Jezebel.

Track listing 
Ashes To Ashes - 04:38
A Raven At Midnight - 05:20
The Widow's Grief - 02:34
The Widow's Peak - 04:50
Calling All Heroes - 04:48
Curse of the Pharaoh - 05:10
The Tolling of the Bell - 05:45
Secrets - 03:48
Madness - 04:44
Back to Heaven - 04:31
Masquerade - 04:27
The Magic of the Chords - 05:15
Voice of Authority - 09:02

Personnel

Trace E. Zaber - vocals
David Shankle - guitars
Brian M. Gordon - bass
Eddie Foltz - drums
Ed Bethishou - keyboards

2003 debut albums